Rikki Sheriffe (born 5 May 1984) is a former English rugby league footballer who last played for the Keighley Cougars in League 1. Between 2010 and 2012 he played rugby union for Newcastle Falcons.

In his earlier rugby league career he played for the Bradford Bulls, Halifax, York City Knights, Harlequins RL and Doncaster.

Since the start of 2017 Sheriffe is also Keighley's development coach.

His brother Jode Sheriffe is a Jamaican international and for two seasons, 2015–16, Rikki, Jodie and their other brother Jesse all played for Keighley.

On 24 Oct 2019 it was announced that Sheriffe had retired and taken up a role as Assistant Coach for Halifax Panthers

References

External links
(archived by web.archive.org) Statistics at slstats.org

1984 births
Living people
Black British sportspeople
Bradford Bulls players
Doncaster R.L.F.C. players
English people of Jamaican descent
English rugby league players
English rugby union players
Halifax R.L.F.C. players
Huddersfield Giants players
Keighley Cougars players
London Broncos players
Newcastle Falcons players
Rugby league players from Bradford
Rugby league wingers
Rugby union players from Bradford
York City Knights players